London Nicole Breed (born August 11, 1974) is an American politician who is the 45th and current mayor of the City and County of San Francisco. She was supervisor for District 5 and was president of the Board of Supervisors from 2015 to 2018.

Raised in the Western Addition neighborhood of San Francisco, Breed worked in government after college. She was elected to the Board of Supervisors in 2012 (taking office in January 2013), and elected its president in 2015. As president of the Board, Breed, according to the city charter, became the acting mayor of San Francisco following the death of Mayor Ed Lee. She served in this role from December 12, 2017, to January 23, 2018.

Breed won the San Francisco mayoral special election held on June 5, 2018. Breed is the first black woman, second black person after Willie Brown, and second woman after Dianne Feinstein to be elected mayor of San Francisco. She was sworn in as mayor on July 11, 2018.

Early life and education 
Born in San Francisco, Breed was raised by her grandmother in Plaza East public housing in the Western Addition neighborhood of the city. Breed later wrote of her childhood in San Francisco: "... five of us living on $900 per month. 'Recycling' meant drinking out of old mayonnaise jars. Violence was never far away. And once a week, we took Grandma's pushcart to the community room to collect government-issued groceries." Her younger sister died of a drug overdose in 2006 and her brother is in prison serving a 44-year sentence for a 2000 manslaughter and armed robbery conviction, for which Breed has repeatedly asked for clemency from the governor's office.  Breed said her brother's early release from prison was "what’s best for both Napoleon and society overall".

Breed graduated with honors from Galileo High School. She earned a bachelor's degree in political science-public service from the University of California, Davis in 1997 and a master's degree in public administration from the University of San Francisco in 2012.

Early career 
Breed worked as an intern in the Office of Housing and Neighborhood Services for Mayor Willie Brown. In 2002, she became the executive director of the African American Art & Culture Complex, where she raised over $2.5 million to renovate the complex's 34,000 square foot space, including an art gallery, theater space, and a recording studio. Breed was named to the San Francisco Redevelopment Agency Commission in 2004. In 2010, Mayor Gavin Newsom appointed her to the San Francisco Fire Commission.

San Francisco Board of Supervisors 

In November 2012, Breed was elected to the District 5 supervisor seat, defeating incumbent Christina Olague, who had been appointed to the seat that year by Mayor Ed Lee after Supervisor Ross Mirkarimi was elected sheriff. Following five rounds of ranked-choice voting allocations, Breed won by over 12 points, marking the first time in San Francisco history that a challenger unseated a district supervisor. (The feat has occurred twice since, with Aaron Peskin unseating Supervisor Julie Christensen in 2015 to reclaim his District 3 seat, and Rafael Mandelman beating Supervisor Jeff Sheehy in District 8 in June 2018.)

Breed was inaugurated as District 5 supervisor on January 8, 2013, with then-California Attorney General Kamala Harris administering the oath of office. On January 8, 2015, Breed was elected President of the San Francisco Board of Supervisors first by a vote of 8 to 3 and then unanimously. She defeated supervisor David Campos, who was also nominated for the position. Breed succeeded District Four Supervisor Katy Tang, who assumed the presidency temporarily after then-Board President David Chiu resigned to begin serving in the California Assembly.

As part of an FBI investigation into public corruption and bid-fixing primarily involving then-State Senator Leland Yee, businessman Derf Butler was recorded talking about allegedly paying for access to Breed. According to court documents released in 2015, Butler told an FBI source that he "pays Supervisor Breed with untraceable debit cards for clothing and trips in exchange for advantages on contracts in San Francisco." The allegation was denied by Breed, who as a member of the Board of Supervisors had no role in contract selections, and no evidence has ever been presented to substantiate it.

In February 2016, Breed announced her reelection bid to represent District 5. The top issues she identified in her announcement were building and protecting affordable housing, increasing public safety, improving environmental health, and modernizing public transportation. Dean Preston, an attorney, ran against her. Breed won reelection 52% to 48% on November 8, 2016, beating Preston in 46 of the district's 68 precincts.

Breed was unanimously reelected to another two-year term as Board President on January 9, 2017. No other supervisors were nominated for the position.

Mayor of San Francisco 
Following the death of Mayor Ed Lee on December 12, 2017, Breed became the city's Acting Mayor by virtue of her position as President of the Board of Supervisors. She served in this position until January 23, 2018, when the Board of Supervisors selected Mark Farrell to serve as the interim "caretaker" mayor until a special election on June 5. Supervisors Aaron Peskin, Jane Kim (herself a candidate for Mayor), and others considered the progressive members of the board, sought to deny Breed the benefits of incumbency going into the election and to maintain a separation of powers between the positions of mayor and board president, both of which Breed occupied at the time. Progressive Supervisor Hillary Ronen delivered a speech accusing Breed of being supported by "white, rich men" and billionaires such as Ron Conway.

Breed ran in the mayoral special election held on June 5. She led in the initial count's first-place votes with 35.6 percent, with Mark Leno in second with 25.9 percent, and Kim with 22.8 percent. Leno took the lead early the next day after the initial tabulation of ranked-choice ballots, but Breed retook the lead on June 9. On June 13, with 9,000 ballots left to count, Leno conceded defeat and congratulated Breed on her victory. Breed resigned as president of the Board of Supervisors on June 26, 2018 and was succeeded by Malia Cohen in a unanimous vote by the Board. Breed retained her position as District 5 supervisor until assuming the mayoralty on July 11. Breed was elected to a full term in the 2019 mayoral election against five relatively unknown candidates.

In March 2019, Breed awarded a posthumous certificate of honor to Sinn Féin politician and former IRA member Martin McGuinness for his "courageous service in the military". The nomination had been made by the United Irish Societies, who had appointed him honorary marshal in the St. Patrick's Day parade. She apologized two days later following controversy over McGuinness's involvement with the IRA.

On March 7, 2019, Breed and several other Northern California mayors endorsed Kamala Harris for president in the 2020 Democratic Party presidential primaries. Harris later dropped out of the race. On January 23, 2020, Breed endorsed Mike Bloomberg for president in the primaries.

In December 2020, Governor Gavin Newsom announced that Alex Padilla would succeed Kamala Harris as U.S. senator after she was elected to serve as Vice President of the United States. Breed and former San Francisco mayor Willie Brown expressed disappointment that the replacement for the seat was not an African American woman as Harris was the only African American woman serving in the Senate at the time.

Housing and homelessness 
Breed made homelessness an early focus of her administration. In October, she announced plans to build 1,000 shelter beds by 2020. To help achieve this goal, she introduced legislation declaring a shelter crisis in San Francisco, which allows the city to waive certain permitting and contracting requirements for homeless services. She also has worked to expand mental health and substance abuse recovery beds. When the Controller found an extra $415 million in property taxes, Breed introduced legislation to fund housing and homelessness programs with the discretionary portion of the funding. She also authored legislation with Supervisor Rafael Mandelman to expand San Francisco's conservatorship laws, based on California Senate Bill 1045, authored by State Senator Scott Wiener.

Breed created a task force of members of the San Francisco Department of Public Works to clean up feces from city sidewalks, known as a Poop Patrol.

Ethics Violations 
A series of 2018 reports in the San Francisco Examiner focused on Breed's use of campaign funds carried over from previous years to pay for floats in San Francisco's annual Pride parade, and a 2020 report found that Nick Bovis, a restaurant owner arrested alongside Mohammed Nuru, was solely named on an invoice to pay for Breed's 2015 Pride float, when she was a member of the Board of Supervisors.

Following the FBI's arrest of San Francisco Department of Public Works director Mohammed Nuru on corruption charges, Breed published an article on Medium on February 14, 2020, acknowledging a longtime friendship and a brief relationship with Nuru. The post also reported that Nuru gave Breed $5,600 for car repairs. Breed argued she did not have to disclose since her and Nuru's relationship preceded her mayoralty but was doing so in "the spirit of transparency". Supervisors Hillary Ronen and Matt Haney have criticized Breed's actions, saying that according to the city's ethics laws it is illegal for a supervisor to accept gifts from a subordinate.

A 2020 report in the San Francisco Chronicle found that the woman identified as "Girlfriend 1" by federal officials in the criminal complaint filed against Nuru was Sandra Zuniga, former Director of the city's "Fix-It Team" and of Breed's Office of Neighborhood Services. The Neighborhood Services Office was dissolved shortly after Zuniga was identified as "Girlfriend 1" and remains inactive. In August 2021, Breed was fined $22,000 for abusing her office in a series of ethics violations.

COVID-19 response 
San Francisco issued a state of emergency because of COVID-19 in February 2020, before the federal government suggested doing so, and San Francisco became one of the first American cities to go into lockdown. On March 2, Breed advised residents, "Prepare for possible disruption from an outbreak". Under the state of emergency, private gyms were required to shut down, but the city government petitioned Cal/OSHA for a waiver to allow various government employees to continue to use gyms in city-owned facilities, which were allowed to continue to operate.

On April 24, 2020, Breed reported that her city's PPE orders had been diverted to other cities and countries. She said, “We’ve had issues of our orders being relocated by our suppliers in China. For example, we had isolation gowns on their way to San Francisco and they were diverted to France. We’ve had situations when things we’ve ordered that have gone through Customs were confiscated by FEMA to be diverted to other locations."

In November 2020, Breed attended an eight-person birthday party at the Michelin 3-star restaurant French Laundry in Napa County during the COVID-19 pandemic in California. The event was held in a partially enclosed room, despite California Department of Public Health discouraging such gatherings with a recommended three-household cap. Napa County allowed indoor dining at the time without a household cap. Still, Heather Knight of San Francisco Chronicle noted that the event violated San Francisco health guidelines at the time. San Francisco banned indoor dining three days later. Breed and other California politicians such as Governor Gavin Newsom and San Jose Mayor Sam Liccardo were criticized for not following the same public health guidelines they administered.

During the pandemic, sidewalks and parking spaces were turned into outdoor dining spaces. In 2021, Breed called for allowing small businesses to use sidewalk and parking spaces indefinitely as outdoor dining spaces.

On September 16, 2021, videos surfaced showing Breed violating the city's mask mandate by not wearing a mask indoors while dancing at the Black Cat nightclub. She later explained the onstage reunion of the original members of Tony! Toni! Toné! "was something really monumental that occurred...I got up and started dancing because I was feeling the spirit and I wasn’t thinking about a mask." Breed later responded to critics, "Like, we don’t need the fun police to come in and try and micromanage and tell us what we should or shouldn’t be doing. No one has been more conservative about protecting themselves than I have, not just because I want to set an example, but because I don’t want to get COVID", she added. The city's mask mandate, advocated by Breed, requires everyone to wear a mask indoors regardless of vaccination status. At the time of her presence at the concert, she was photographed not socially distancing or wearing a mask.

Public safety 
Breed authored legislation in 2014 to allow the San Francisco City Attorney to pursue civil damages against graffiti taggers, instead of solely relying on criminal prosecutions to punish taggers. In 2016, City Attorney Dennis Herrera used these new penalties to win a civil judgment against serial tagger Terry Cozy that resulted in a $217,832 fine.

The San Francisco Fire Department's response times to emergency medical calls spiked dramatically in 2014, with ambulances often unavailable to respond. Breed was outspoken in demanding improvements, pushing then-Mayor Lee to do more, expressing a lack of confidence in Fire Chief Joanne Hayes-White, and generating press attention for the issue. Breed fought for substantially more funding for emergency medical services, ultimately succeeding in getting $47.3 million invested to hire EMTs, paramedics, firefighters, and 911 dispatchers, as well as buy new ambulances and fire trucks, and improve SFFD facilities. Breed has cited her work on this issue as helping to reduce ambulance response times by over 26%. Her work also helped her earn the sole endorsement of the San Francisco Firefighters Local 798 union in the 2018 mayoral election.

In 2015, Breed worked with then-Mayor Ed Lee to help add 400 new police officers to the San Francisco Police Department. After the shooting of Mario Woods by San Francisco police officers on December 2, 2015, Breed and Supervisor Malia Cohen passed a Resolution calling for a federal investigation of the shooting and a Department of Justice review of the SFPD's use of force policies. This ultimately resulted in 272 recommendations to improve the SFPD.

In 2015, Breed led the effort to stop a proposed $380 million new jail for San Francisco, saying: “I’ve seen way too many people from my community, friends, even family members, end up on the wrong side of these iron bars,” and calling the jail proposal “a return to an era of mass incarceration, an era San Francisco is trying to leave behind.” She created a working group to develop an alternative to the jail proposal, including "new mental health facilities and current jail retrofits needed to uphold public safety and better serve at-risk individuals."

In July 2019, Breed signed an ordinance effectively banning the sale of e-cigarettes in San Francisco, both at brick-and-mortar stores and online to a San Francisco address.

Despite Breed publicly declaring support for overdose prevention sites, her administration abruptly stopped a nonprofit that was about to open a supervised drug use site to prevent overdoses.

Housing 

As Supervisor in 2014, Breed secured $2 million to renovate unused public housing units for formerly homeless families.

In 2015, Breed helped pass "neighborhood preference" legislation to prioritize neighborhood residents for the affordable homes built in their community. When the federal Department of Housing and Urban Development threatened to block the legislation, she flew to Washington, D.C., with a delegation of San Francisco officials and persuaded it to let the program proceed. The program first went into effect for the Willie B. Kennedy apartments in Breed's district, with 39 units prioritized for community residents at risk of economic displacement.

San Francisco passed legislation in 2015 to create the Neighborhood Commercial Transit District in the Divisadero and Fillmore corridors in her district. The laws removed housing density caps, allowing more homes to be built on a given parcel without increasing the building's size or height. The Affordable Divis group requested that Breed rescind the law, citing concerns about the availability of affordable units and lack of community input. She declined, citing the need for more homes in the city and conflicts with Proposition C from 2012.

In April 2015, the city of San Francisco passed legislation to remove minimum parking space requirements for new buildings and allow unused parking spaces in existing buildings to be converted housing.

Breed was the lead sponsor and co-sponsor of two housing ballot measures: Proposition A in 2015, a $310 million bond for affordable housing which passed with 74% support, and Proposition C in 2016, a $261 million housing bond that repurposed unused city bond funds for affordable housing and passed with 77% support. Breed joined Supervisor Ahsha Safai in supporting the 2018 "Housing for All" ballot measure, Proposition D, to increase the city's tax on commercial rents to "raise about $100 million a year to pay for 10,000 low- and middle-income housing units and shelter accommodations for the city’s homeless population over the next decade." After facing a competing tax increase measure, Prop D did not pass.

In 2017, Breed coauthored legislation to provide civil counsel for tenants facing eviction, reducing the chances of vulnerable tenants unfairly losing their homes. Voters approved a similar measure in June 2018, Proposition F.

Breed is a major advocate for modular housing, arguing that it can be built more quickly and cheaply than conventional construction, helping the city create more housing sooner. As Acting Mayor, she announced a partnership with labor unions to build a modular housing factory in or near San Francisco.

As a candidate for mayor, Breed aligned herself with pro-housing leaders like State Senator Scott Wiener and the SF YIMBY (Yes In My Back Yard) Party, both of whom endorsed her. She committed to Mayor Lee's goal of building at least 5,000 new units of housing each year but failed to achieve this number in any year as mayor. In her inaugural address on July 11, 2018, Breed said: “The politics of ‘no’ has plagued our city for far too long—‘not on my block, not in my backyard.’ We have made mistakes in the past by not moving housing production forward all over this city. I plan to change the politics of ‘no’ to the politics of ‘yes.’ Yes, we will build more housing.”

Transportation

Muni and transit service

Breed carried multiple pieces of legislation allowing Muni to purchase hundreds of new buses and replace its entire fleet of trains. Introduced over several years, her legislation provided for 50 hybrid buses, 260 light rail vehicles, 61 hybrid buses, 60 trolley buses, 98 hybrid buses, and 33 trolley buses. The 260 new light rail vehicles are slated to replace Muni's aging fleet of Breda trains, add 24 trains for the new Central Subway, and provide 85 more trains for added service throughout the system. Built by Siemens in Sacramento, the new trains are lighter and quieter than the ones they replace and project to run almost 12 times longer before needing major repair. The first Siemens train went into service in San Francisco in 2017.

As Supervisor, Breed focused much attention on the N Judah Muni train line, which runs through District 5 and is the busiest Muni line in the city. She worked with Muni to launch a morning commute shuttle train, serving the most crowded stops from Cole Valley to Downtown. Breed worked with then-Supervisor Scott Wiener in 2013 to persuade Muni to change the seat layout in its trains from forward-facing to side-facing to create additional room for passengers. Muni initially refused to test the idea, so the Supervisors called a public hearing. Muni eventually agreed, testing the change on several trains. Riders preferred this design according to Muni's surveys, and Muni incorporated it into their new train designs.

Breed worked with the San Francisco Municipal Transportation Agency and Bay Area Rapid Transit and carried the legislation to add cellular service for riders on Muni's underground trains. The lack of cell service has been a long-standing complaint by riders.

Transportation funding

Breed cosponsored 2014's Proposition A, a $500 million bond to fund street repaving, infrastructure repair, transit service improvements, and increased bicycle and pedestrian safety. It passed with 72% support. She was also the deciding vote to place 2014's Proposition B on the ballot, which required transportation funding to be increased with population growth. It passed with 61% support and now provides approximately $25 million per year for transit, bike, and pedestrian improvements. When Kezar Drive, a major thoroughfare in her district, fell into disrepair, Breed addressed what she called a "case study in bureaucracy" between the Department of Public Works and Recreation and Parks Department and got the road repaved.

In 2015, Breed coauthored legislation to create San Francisco's Transportation Sustainability Fee (TSF), requiring residential developers to pay a fee toward transportation improvements. The legislation is generating approximately $14 million annually in new funds for Muni and other transportation projects. Breed also worked with Mayor Lee to add $48.1 million in funding in the San Francisco Municipal Transportation Agency Fiscal Year 2015-16 budget for "service increases, new capital investments, purchase of buses and trains, and bicycle and pedestrian safety enhancements." Also in 2015, she helped approve and secure funding for the Van Ness Bus Rapid Transit project, which is making infrastructure repairs and safety improvements to the Van Ness corridor and is projected to cut transit travel times by up to 32%.

In 2017, Breed called for a hearing at the Board of Supervisors after the Municipal Transportation Agency disclosed that it had only spent 2% of the $500 million in bonds that voters had approved for transportation improvements more than two years earlier in 2014. Breed argued that delays at the SFMTA mean "our money grew less valuable and our transportation projects more delayed."

Breed carried the legislation to place Regional Measure 3 on the San Francisco ballot in June 2018. The measure passed and "will be used to finance a $4.45 billion slate of highway and transit improvements." including BART, Muni, and Caltrain.

Bikes and street safety

During her first few months as Supervisor in 2013, Breed persuaded city departments to complete two new bike lanes on Oak and Fell Streets ahead of schedule, prompting the local transportation site StreetsblogSF to say she had “emerged as a bicycling champion.” She secured federal funding for the redesign of Masonic Boulevard in her district, which added bike lanes and traffic safety measures to one of the most dangerous corridors in the city. The official ribbon-cutting for the completed Masonic Avenue Streetscape Improvement Project between Geary Boulevard and the Panhandle took place in August 2018. The project cost $25 million. The bicycle improvements were limited to a buffered bike lane, which typically cost $15,000 per mile.

Breed cosponsored the 2014 legislation to implement Vision Zero, a plan to eliminate all traffic fatalities via improved engineering, education, and enforcement. Breed's efforts to achieve Vision Zero in San Francisco have thus far been ineffective. As mayor, traffic fatalities increased 35% from 31 in 2018 to 42 in 2019. She also cosponsored the 2016 legislation to create the city's Transportation Demand Management (TDM) Program, in which housing developers provide transit benefits to their residents such as transit passes, bike parking, and carpool programs.

When the SFPD began ticketing bicyclists for not completely stopping at stop signs in 2015, Breed became the first elected official in San Francisco to support the “Idaho Stop” law, which allows bicyclists to yield at stop signs instead of coming to a complete stop. A group of bicyclists protested the SFPD enforcement by completely stopping at all stop signs, a demonstration that "snarled traffic" and was "flanked by an army of TV cameras and amused onlookers." Breed and former Supervisor John Avalos wrote legislation to enact the Idaho Stop law, which passed the Board of Supervisors but was vetoed by Mayor Lee. Breed also passed legislation in 2015 banning certain obstructions to bike lanes and removing parking minimums in new buildings.

A street construction project on Haight Street in Breed's district caused multiple safety issues in 2015 when Synergy Project Management, a subcontractor working under the General contractor Ghilotti Bros., repeatedly hit underground gas lines. Breed had work on the project stopped and called a hearing at the Board of Supervisors about the matter. She later passed legislation with then-Supervisor Scott Wiener to revise the city's contract awarding process, emphasizing a bidder's past safety record.

In her 2016 reelection campaign Breed earned the sole endorsement of the San Francisco Bicycle Coalition, which said: "Breed has consistently supported smart, data-driven traffic enforcement and helped to move important bike projects.”

Environmental protection

CleanPowerSF

Breed's best-known environmental work is likely her successful fight to launch the city's clean electrical energy program, CleanPowerSF, a Community Choice Aggregation program in which San Francisco purchases renewable, greenhouse-gas-free electrical energy and makes it available to San Francisco ratepayers. Its ultimate goal is to achieve 100% clean electrical energy in the city. According to the San Francisco Department of the Environment's Climate Action Strategy: "Moving to 100% renewable electricity is the single biggest step the City can take to reduce GHG [Greenhouse Gas] emissions. The potential GHG emissions reduction from this program is estimated to total 941,000 metric tons (mT) of CO2e annually by 2030."

When Breed took office in 2013 CleanPowerSF had, according to the San Francisco League of Conservation Voters, "languished for 12 years" in the face of opposition from multiple mayoral administrations, the city's utility provider PG&E, and other business interests. "Breed took it upon herself to get CleanPowerSF off the ground," said the League of Conservation Voters.

Under the city's charter, the San Francisco Public Utilities Commission had ultimate authority to approve or reject the program. When they rejected proposed power rates for the program in August 2013, Breed authored a resolution at the Board of Supervisors, arguing: "In failing to set not-to-exceed rates for CleanPowerSF, the Public Utilities Commission is contradicting the policy directives of the Board of Supervisors...The Board of Supervisors refuses to acquiesce its policymaking authority to the Executive bureaucracy; and... If the Public Utilities Commissioners fail to set not-to-exceed rates, or hereafter fail in any way to timely implement CleanPowerSF, the Board of Supervisors shall, whether at the Board Chamber or the ballot, exercise every means at its disposal to enact its policy objective."

Breed worked for the subsequent 17 months to launch CleanPowerSF, often fighting with the Lee administration. In January 2015 Mayor Lee announced he would support a slightly revised version of CleanPowerSF, and the program proceeded toward launch.

In the summer of 2015 the International Brotherhood of Electrical Workers Local Union 1245, which represents PG&E employees, submitted a ballot measure, Proposition G, that would have imposed restrictions on CleanPowerSF. Breed and former Supervisor John Avalos wrote a competing measure, Proposition H, that would have required PG&E to disclose its use of nuclear power among other things. Following negotiations between IBEW representative Hunter Stern and Breed, Avalos, and their staff, IBEW agreed to oppose their own proposition and support Breed's measure. It passed with 80% support.

Polystyrene ban

In 2016, the city of San Francisco passed the nation's strongest ban on sale and use of products made from polystyrene foam, including expanded polystyrene foam (also called Styrofoam) for food service ware, egg cartons, coolers, and packing peanuts. The law made national and international news.

In the final week of Breed's 2016 reelection campaign, she released a comical web video about the legislation, "Styrofoam Monster". In the ad, she chases away a bully who is dressed in a costume made of polystyrene foam. The San Francisco Chronicle wrote, "The award for most creative campaign ad goes to Board of Supervisors President London Breed..[It] is akin to an ingenious high school video production."

Drug take back legislation
In 2015, the city of San Francisco passed legislation requiring drug manufacturers to fund a drug take-back program in San Francisco, enabling consumers to place unused medications in secure drop-off bins in pharmacies. Unused drugs are often disposed in the trash or toilet which can pollute waterways or lead to accidental poisonings. Breed published an op-ed in support of the legislation. It passed unanimously on March 17, 2015, making San Francisco only the third county in the nation to launch such a program. The program has collected well over 20 tons of medications.

Despite her environmental record during her first term on the Board of Supervisors, the local chapter of the Sierra Club endorsed her opponent. This prompted Breed's then-Chief of Staff Conor Johnston to write a scathing article in the San Francisco Examiner accusing the local Sierra Club chapter of hypocrisy and "bewildering anti-environmentalism" for blocking new housing and engaging in "political tribalism".

Basic income 
Breed has explored multiple options for guaranteed income. In March 2021, Breed launched a program to provide guaranteed income to artists impacted by the COVID-19 pandemic.  Then, in November 2022, Breed launched a program to provide income for low income transgender individuals.

Letters of Resignation Controversy 

In September 2022 a public records request revealed Breed had required 48 of her appointees to boards and commissions to sign undated letters of resignation for her use. The Mayor's spokesperson stated the letters were only for "the most extreme circumstances." Breed later announced she would discontinue the practice.

See also
 List of mayors of the 50 largest cities in the United States

References

External links 

 
 
 

|-

|-

|-

1974 births
African-American activists
21st-century American politicians
21st-century American women politicians
Activists from California
African-American mayors in California
American community activists
American women civil servants
Democratic Party San Francisco Bay Area politicians
Living people
Local government officers
Mayors of San Francisco
San Francisco Board of Supervisors members
University of California, Davis alumni
University of San Francisco alumni
Women city councillors in California
Women mayors of places in California
African-American city council members in California
21st-century African-American politicians
20th-century African-American people
African-American women mayors